Sergei Gennadiyevich Khorokhordin (born October 9, 1985 in Barnaul) is a Russian gymnast. He helped Russia to win gold in the team event at the European Artistic Gymnastics Championships in Lucerne, Switzerland. He is best known for his high-bar and ring routines but says that parallel bars and high bar are his best events.

See also
List of Olympic male artistic gymnasts for Russia

References

External links
 
 
 

1985 births
Living people
Sportspeople from Barnaul
Russian male artistic gymnasts
Gymnasts at the 2008 Summer Olympics
Olympic gymnasts of Russia
Medalists at the World Artistic Gymnastics Championships
Universiade medalists in gymnastics
Universiade bronze medalists for Russia
21st-century Russian people